Liuji is a town of Zhongmu County in north-central Henan province, China, located  northwest of the county seat in the eastern suburbs of Zhengzhou, the provincial capital. , it has 29 villages under its administration.

See also 
 List of township-level divisions of Henan

References 

Township-level divisions of Henan
Zhongmu County